The Raw Air 2018 is the second edition of Raw Air, a ten-day tournament for men in ski jumping and ski flying held across Norway between 9–18 March 2018. It is part of the 2017/18 World Cup season.

Competition

Format 
The competition is held on four different hills in Oslo, Lillehammer, Trondheim, and Vikersund. It lasts for ten consecutive days with a total of 16 rounds from individual events, team events and qualifications (prologues).

Nations

Schedule

Map of hosts

Individual

Team

Standings

Raw Air

Footnotes

References 

2018
2018 in ski jumping
2018 in Norwegian sport
March 2018 sports events in Europe